USS Derry (ID-1391),  was a United States Navy barge in service from 1917 to 1919.

Derry was built as a non-self-propelled commercial barge at South Roundout, New York, in 1894. The U.S. Navy acquired her from her owners, the Susquehanna Coal Company of New York City, in November 1917, assigning her naval registry Identification Number (Id. No.) 1391. She served in and near New York Harbor through the end of the war.

Derry was returned to her owners in July 1919.

References
Department of the Navy Naval Historical Center: Online Library of Selected Images: Civilian Ships: Derry (American Barge, 1894). Was U.S. Navy barge Derry (ID # 1391) in 1917-1919
NavSource Online: Section Patrol Craft Photo Archive Derry (ID 1391)

Ships built in New York (state)
1894 ships
World War I auxiliary ships of the United States
Barges of the United States Navy